In geometry, the gyroelongated bipyramids are an infinite set of polyhedra, constructed by elongating an  bipyramid by inserting an  antiprism between its congruent halves.

Forms
Two members of the set can be deltahedra, that is, constructed entirely of equilateral triangles: the gyroelongated square bipyramid, a Johnson solid, and the icosahedron, a Platonic solid. The gyroelongated triangular bipyramid can be made with equilateral triangles, but is not a deltahedron because it has coplanar faces, i.e. is not strictly convex. With pairs of triangles merged into rhombi, it can be seen as a trigonal trapezohedron. The other members can be constructed with isosceles triangles.

See also 
 Elongated bipyramid
 Gyroelongated pyramid
 Elongated pyramid
 Diminished trapezohedron

External links
Conway Notation for Polyhedra Try: "knAn", where n=4,5,6... example "k5A5" is an icosahedron.

Pyramids and bipyramids